Nate Miller (born March 21, 1958) is a former American football defensive back who played three seasons with the Denver Gold of the United States Football League. He played college football at Cameron University. He was also a member of the Detroit Drive of the Arena Football League.

References

External links
Just Sports Stats

Living people
1958 births
Players of American football from California
American football defensive backs
African-American players of American football
Cameron Aggies football players
Denver Gold players
Detroit Drive players
Sportspeople from Rialto, California
21st-century African-American people
20th-century African-American sportspeople